The electoral division of Clark is one of the five electorates in the Tasmanian House of Assembly, it is located in Hobart on the western shore of the River Derwent and includes the suburbs below Mount Wellington. Clark is named after Andrew Inglis Clark, a Tasmanian jurist who was the principal author of the Australian Constitution. The electorate shares its name and boundaries with the federal division of Clark.

The electorate was renamed from the electoral division of Denison in September 2018. Denison was named after Sir William Denison, who was Lieutenant Governor of Van Diemen's Land (1847–55), and Governor of New South Wales (1855–61). The renaming of the electorate to Clark was in line with the renaming of the federal division of Denison to Clark.

Clark and the other House of Assembly electoral divisions are each represented by five members elected under the Hare-Clark electoral system (also named after Andrew Inglis Clark).

History and electoral profile
Clark was renamed from the Denison when amendments to the Tasmanian Constitution Act 1934 gained Royal Assent on 28 September 2018, aligning Tasmania's state electoral divisions with the federal divisions which had undergone a boundary redistribution, including renaming Denison to Clark, and was formally gazetted on 14 November 2017.

The division is located on the western side of the Derwent River, covering a part of Kingborough and all of the Hobart and Glenorchy local government areas. Covering an area of 292.26 km² it is the smallest of Tasmania's five electoral divisions.

Representation

Distribution of seats

Members for Clark and Denison

See also

 Tasmanian Legislative Council

References

External links
Parliament of Tasmania
Tasmanian Electoral Commission - House of Assembly

Tasmanian House of Assembly electoral divisions
Southern Tasmania
South East Tasmania